Selvam is a 2005 Tamil-language romantic psychological thriller film  directed and produced by Agathiyan. The film stars Nandha, Uma, and Vani. It was released on 12 August 2005.

Plot

The movie begins with Selvam (Nandha) coming to Chennai. After a quarrel with a person, he suffers a head injury and forgets about his past. He rushes to a hospital where he seeks the help of Dr. Lakshmi (Ranjitha). Lakshmi assigns Dr. Thendral (Uma) to treat him back to his normal self. Selvam does not remember his name, so he is christened as Kannan by the hospital doctors. Thendral falls in love with Kannan and expresses her love for him. A couple of incidents helps Kannan know about his past. He returns to his village and meets his parents and fiancée Jyothy (Vani), waiting for his return. Then, he knows the truth from his sister that he is adopted son to his parents and got abonded from them.Finally, he return to Thendral and reunite with her.

Cast

Nandha as Selvam (Kannan)
Uma as Dr. Thendral
Vani as Jyothy
Ranjitha as Dr. Lakshmi
Monica
Manivannan as Selvam's father
Sabitha Anand as Selvam's mother
Ajay Rathnam as Jyothy's father
K. R. Savithri as Jyothy's mother
Sanjeev as Senthil, Selvam's brother
Ganeshkar as Kesavan
Ajay Raj as Subramaniam
Muthukaalai as Shanmugam
Muthuraja as Muthuraja
Alex
Scissor Manohar
Divyasri
Agathiyan in a cameo appearance
Deva in a guest appearance

Production
After a debacle in his previous film Ramakrishna, the director Agathiyan begun his next directorial venture, initially being titled as Vedanthaangal, was later changed to Selvam. This time, he had turned into producer besides wielding the megaphone, which it gave him more liberty in executing the movie according to his tastes and wish. Director described Selvam as a "movie on human emotions irrespective of the star cast will make it good at the box-office". Nandha Durairaj of Punnagai Poove fame was signed to play the protagonist and Uma of Kadal Pookkal fame was signed to play the female lead. Manivannan was also added in a supporting role, as well as actors such as Ajay Rathnam, Alex, Scissor Manohar, Muthukaalai, Ganeshkar, Sanjeev and Ajay Raj. Actor Nandha said "I have a plum role in this film. Thanks to Agathiyan sir for the confidence he had in me. Agathiyan sir has portrayed the human relationships in a beautiful way with interesting twists and turns". Deva signed to score the music and also appeared in a guest role in the film. The film had five songs including a semi-classical dance which will portray Tamil tradition. Lancy Mohan handle the editing department, respectively, while Ramesh G was selected as the cinematographer and Yoga Magi was the art-director.

Soundtrack

The film score and the soundtrack were composed by Deva. The soundtrack, released on 18 March 2005, features 6 tracks with lyrics written by Agathiyan.

Reception
The film received above average reviews. Indiaglitz.com said "Though not on the levels of his Kadhal Kottai or Gokulathil Seethai, all credit to Agathiyan for giving an engrossing movie with a less known star cast". S. R. Ashok Kumar of The Hindu said "The first half keeps the viewers engrossed. It is only in the latter part that confusion shows up" but he praised the lead pair "Nanda makes good use of the scope the film offers. Uma is not only beautiful but also emotes well" and concluded "Agathiyan deserves kudos for his new venture".

References

2005 films
Films scored by Deva (composer)
2000s Tamil-language films
Films directed by Agathiyan